The Negrași Daffodil Meadow is a protected area near Negrași Commune, in Argeș County, Muntenia, Romania. It was declared as a natural reservation on June 24, 1966.

Position and accessibility
The Daffodil Meadow is situated in the southern part of Argeș County, in the Găvanu-Burdea Plains, near the confluence of Dâmbovnic River and its tributary, Mozacu. It is a remote, unpolluted area.
The access route is the county road DJ503. It is usually closed in winter.

Natural Reservation
The reservation has  and protects a rare daffodil, Narcissus poeticus, ssp. Radiiflorus.

Local importance
Every May 13, a daffodil festival is held in Negrași.

References

Geography of Argeș County
Protected areas of Romania
Meadows in Romania